Fleming is an unincorporated community in Crawford County, Kansas, United States.

History
A post office was opened in Fleming in 1892, and remained in operation until it was discontinued in 1908.

Notable people
The professional baseball player Tom Wilson was born in Fleming in 1890.

References

Further reading

External links
 Crawford County maps: Current, Historic, KDOT

Unincorporated communities in Crawford County, Kansas
Unincorporated communities in Kansas